Streich is a surname. Notable people with the surname include:

Christian Streich, German football manager and former footballer
Daniel Streich, Swiss military instructor
Jacek Streich, Polish rower
Joachim Streich, East German former footballer
Johannes Streich (1891–1977), German military officer
Philip Vidal Streich, American scientist
Rita Streich (1920–1987), operatic soprano

Surnames from nicknames
Toponymic surnames